Minh Thai (born 1965 as Thái Minh) is a Vietnamese-American speedcuber. As a sixteen-year-old Eagles Rock High School student from Los Angeles, he won the first world championship on June 5, 1982 in Budapest by solving a Rubik's Cube in 22.95 seconds.
He is also the author of the book The Winning Solution (1982), a guide to solving the cube. Later, Ortega Corners-First Solution Method for Rubik's Cube is based on Minh Thai's Winning Solution.

World Records

 Current world records are displayed with a red background.

Official personal records

References

External links
The first world championship
Rubik Books
 Video at YouTube : Minh Thai's 1st World Record Rubik's Cube championship 1982

1966 births
Living people
American speedcubers
American non-fiction writers
American people of Vietnamese descent
Sports world record setters